Aralia chinensis (known as Chinese angelica-tree, syn. Aralia sinensis hort.) is a species of the family Araliaceae native to China, Vietnam, and Borneo.

References

External links

Aralia chinensis
Aralia chinensis

chinensis
Trees of China
Trees of Vietnam
Trees of Borneo
Vulnerable plants
Plants described in 1753
Taxa named by Carl Linnaeus